Erythroxylum rufum, the rufous false coca, is a flowering plant species in the genus Erythroxylum.

Ombuin-3-O-rhamnosylglucoside, a glycoside of ombuin, can be found in E. rufum.

References

External links

rufum
Plants described in 1789
Taxa named by Antonio José Cavanilles